The Taíno were an indigenous people of the Caribbean.

Taino may also refer to:
The Taíno language
Taino, Lombardy, a town in Italy
Taínos (film), a 2006 Puerto Rican film
Eric Taino (born 1975), American tennis player
Radio Taíno, a Cuban radio station

See also
Taina (disambiguation)
Indigenous peoples of the Caribbean